Alimentos Polar, C.A. is an Empresas Polar subsidiary that operates in the foods and drinks area, manufacturing and sending deliveries to its clients.

Rice
On February 28, 2009 Venezuelan President Hugo Chávez ordered the military to temporarily seize control of all the rice processing plants in the country and force them to produce at full capacity, which he alleged they had been avoiding in response to the price caps instituted several years previously. For a period of 90 days the Instituto para la Defensa de las Personas en el Acceso a los Bienes y Servicios (Indepabis) supervised production at a number of rice processing plants, including Alimentos' Planta Calabozo Arroz plant in Guárico state. The minister for food, Félix Osorio, said the measure was temporary one and not intended to be a nationalisation.

The country's largest food processor, Empresas Polar, said that the regulated price of (plain) rice was well below the cost of production, and as a result 90% of its rice output was the flavoured rice not subject to price controls. It also said that its plant was operating at 50% capacity due to raw material shortages; the government however claimed to have found 2 months' worth of raw rice in storage at the plant. Alimentos Polar processes around 6% of Venezuela's rice production.

Products 

Harina P.A.N.
Mazeite (Cooking oil)
Alimentos Primor (Foods)
Yukery (Drinks)

References

External links
Alimentos Polar, C.A.

Empresas Polar
Food and drink companies of Venezuela
Food and drink companies established in 1954
1954 establishments in Venezuela
Venezuelan brands